Capitol Federal Savings Bank is a federally chartered and insured savings bank founded in 1893 and is headquartered in Topeka, Kansas. Capitol Federal has 45 branch locations and 9 in-store branches, serving primarily the metropolitan areas of Topeka, Wichita, Lawrence, Manhattan, Emporia and Salina, Kansas and both the Kansas and Missouri sides of the greater Kansas City metropolitan area.

Lines of business
Capitol Federal is the premier residential lender in Kansas with more than $9 billion in assets. Capitol Federal offers:
 Single-family residential lending
 Construction loans and other consumer loans
 Checking accounts
 Savings accounts
 Money market accounts
 IRAs
 Certificates of Deposit
 Commercial loans
 Small Business loans
 Business banking services and cash management
 Trust Services and wealth management
 Insurance Products

History
Throughout its history, Capitol Federal has maintained its commitment to the American dream of homeownership and dedication to its corporate philosophy of Safety in Savings, Sound Lending Policies, Quality Customer Service and Commitment to Community.

Highlights

September 16, 1893

A group of 15 men gathered for the first time to form a savings and loan.

July, 1899

The association changed its name to the Capitol Building and Loan Association.

1926

Henry A. Bubb was hired.

1938

Capitol Building and Loan Association changed its name to Capitol Federal Savings and Loan Association.  In difficult times, the association stood at $6 million in total assets, half of what it had been prior to the Crash of 1929.  Although these were challenging times, the association came out stronger, leading to an era of success.

1941

Capitol Federal board of directors named Henry A. Bubb as president of the association.

1943

The association became “the largest federally insured association in the state.”

1950

Assets grew to more than $19 million; and the first branch office in Kansas was opened at 1201 Topeka Boulevard in Topeka.

1958

Assets reached $100 million.

March 1959

John C. Dicus joined the association

1960

Capitol Federal installed its first "computer" - a Univac "tab" machine - in the Home Office at 6th and Kansas in Topeka.

December 9, 1961

Capitol Federal's new Home Office opened at 700 South Kansas Avenue in Topeka on December 9, 1961.  The office reflected the times with the inclusion of a Civil Defense bomb shelter in the basement.

1972

CapFed took the lead in technological advances with the installation of an online data processing system.

1974

The association introduced the Passcard.

1975

Association became second savings and loan association in the nation to offer customers off-premises access to their accounts.

1977

Capitol Federal reached $1 billion in assets.

1989

Chairman Henry A. Bubb died in January 1989.  John C. Dicus was then named chairman.

1993

Capitol Federal reached its 100th anniversary, with assets of more than $3.9 billion.

October 1996

John B. Dicus was elected president, with John C. Dicus continuing as chairman and CEO.

March 31, 1999

Capitol Federal's Plan of Reorganization and Stock Issuance Plan is successfully completed, transforming Capitol Federal from a mutual savings association to a stock savings bank.  Capitol Federal Savings and Loan Association now known as Capitol Federal Savings Bank.  The Capitol Federal Foundation was established, as part of the reorganization.

2001

Capitol Federal introduced True Blue Online

January 2009

John C. Dicus honored for 50 years of service to Capitol Federal.  Due to the board's mandatory retirement age, John C. Dicus retired as chairman from the board, continuing as chairman emeritus.  John B. Dicus was elected chairman of the board, now serving as chairman, president and CEO.

2010

The year 2010 was highlighted by the second-step conversion from a mutual holding company form of organization to a stock form of organization, completed in December 2010.  At that time, Capitol Federal Financial was succeeded by Capitol Federal Financial, Inc.

2013

During the Capitol Federal Financial, Inc. annual meeting in January 2014, Chairman Dicus announced results from Fiscal Year 2013, including total assets of $9.19 billion, total loans of $5.96 billion, and total deposits of $4.61 billion.

Community Involvement

The Capitol Federal Foundation was established to benefit the communities in which Capitol Federal operates.  The foundation is committed to improving the quality of life in these communities by investing in the citizens of today and tomorrow.  The main areas of focus for accomplishing this mission are education, community development, the United Way and other charitable purposes.

References

External links
 

Banks based in Kansas
American companies established in 1893
Banks established in 1893
Companies based in Topeka, Kansas
Companies listed on the Nasdaq
1893 establishments in Kansas